Blacks likely began arriving in Oregon in the 1500s as free and enslaved passengers of English and Spanish ships. The first confirmed presence of a person of African descent in Oregon is Marcus Lopius, a crew member from Cabo Verde aboard the American ship Lady Washington that reached Oregon in 1788. An enslaved man known as York came to Oregon in 1803 as part of the Lewis and Clark Expedition. Other early Black explorers came overland to Oregon as free trappers or as laborers for John Jacob Astor's Pacific Fur Company and the British Hudson Bay Company.

Both enslaved and free Black people settled in Oregon in the 1840s and 50s. Although slavery had been outlawed in Oregon since the 1843 Organic Laws of Oregon, at least 40 enslaved Black people were brought to the Oregon Country. Some remained enslaved for years after their arrival.

In 1844, George Washington Bush traveled west on the Oregon Trail. After hearing about Oregon's exclusion law he decided not to settle in the Oregon Territory, and settled in what would become Washington Territory instead. According to Perseverance, “By 1860, African Americans were present in fourteen of the nineteen Oregon counties.”

The Oregon black exclusion laws were attempts to prevent black people from settling within the borders of the settlement and eventual U.S. state of Oregon. The first such law took effect in 1844, when the Provisional Government of Oregon voted to exclude  black settlers from Oregon's borders. The law authorized a punishment for any black settler remaining in the territory to be whipped with "not less than twenty nor more than thirty-nine stripes" for every six months they remained. Additional laws aimed at African Americans entering Oregon were ratified in 1849 and 1857. The last of these laws was repealed in 1926. The laws, born of anti-slavery and anti-black beliefs, were often justified as a reaction to fears of black people instigating Native American uprisings.

See also 

 Racism in Oregon

References 

African-American history of Oregon